Frank James Hanna (7 March 1893 – 23 June 1967) was a former Australian rules footballer who played with Carlton in the Victorian Football League (VFL). During the 1914 season he transferred to Hawthorn in the Victorian Football Association where he played until the end of the 1915 season.

He enlisted in the Australian Imperial Force in February 1916 and served in the Australian 119th Field Artillery (Howitzer) Battery as a gunner before becoming a driver, and reaching the rank of corporal, in the Australian Army Motor Transport Company.

Notes

External links 
		
Frank Hanna's profile at Blueseum

Australian rules footballers from Melbourne
Carlton Football Club players
Hawthorn Football Club (VFA) players
North Melbourne Football Club (VFA) players
1893 births
1967 deaths
Australian military personnel of World War I
People from Ascot Vale, Victoria
Military personnel from Melbourne